is a video game designer and programmer at R.U.N (Release Universe Network) and a former Fill-in-Cafe game designer. In 1998, he left Fill-in-Cafe due to the developer filing for bankruptcy. On December 19, 2005, he established the company R.U.N with former Treasure employee Masaki Ukyo.

Works
Game designer
 Asuka 120% Burning Fest franchise (except the last two titles)
 Mad Stalker: Full Metal Force (with Masaki Ukyo)
 Makeruna! Makendō 2: Kimero Youkai Souri (Sony PlayStation version)
 Panzer Bandit
 Phantom Breaker (with Masaki Ukyo)

Programmer
 Asuka 120% BURNING Fest. franchise (except the last two titles)
 Mad Stalker: Full Metal Force (with Masaki Ukyo)

Graphic designer
 Mad Stalker: Full Metal Force

Special thanks
 Kakutō Haō Densetsu Algunos

External links

Living people
Japanese video game designers
People from Aichi Prefecture
Year of birth missing (living people)